The 2014 National Football Challenge Cup was 24th season of domestic cup tournament in Pakistani football. It was sponsored by National Bank of Pakistan, and known as NBP National Football Challenge Cup. 12 teams participated in the tournament.

National Bank were the defending champions, but were eliminated in quarter-finals by Karachi Port Trust.

Pakistan Airforce won their first title after defeating KESC 2–1 in the finals.

Teams
The 21 teams participating in the tournament are as below:

 Khan Research Laboratories (PPL)
 National Bank (TH) (H)
 Habib Bank
 Pakistan Navy
 Karachi Port Trust
 Pakistan Airlines
 Pakistan Airforce
 KESC
 Pakistan Police
 Pak Afghan Clearing
 WAPDA
 Higher Education Commission

Notes TH = Challenge Cup title holders; PPL = Pakistan Premier League winners; H = Host

Group stage

Group A

Group B

Group C

Group D

Knockout round

Quarter-finals

Semifinals

Finals

Bracket

Statistics

Top goalscorers

References

Pakistan National Football Challenge Cup
Cup